Alfred Lundberg (5 April 1852 – 11 April 1935) was a Swedish stage and silent film actor. He appeared in 24 films between 1914 and 1930. He was the father of the actress Signe Lundberg-Settergren.

Selected filmography
 The Strike (1914)
 A Good Girl Keeps Herself in Good Order (1914)
 Hearts That Meet (1914)
 A Fortune Hunter (1921)
 Life in the Country (1924)
 Ingmar's Inheritance (1925)
 The Lady of the Camellias (1925)
 40 Skipper Street (1925)
 The Tales of Ensign Stål (1926)
 Gustaf Wasa (1928)
 Charlotte Löwensköld (1930)

References

External links

1852 births
1935 deaths
Swedish male stage actors
Swedish male film actors
Swedish male silent film actors
People from Uppsala Municipality
19th-century Swedish male actors
20th-century Swedish male actors